A Processing Instruction (PI) is an SGML and XML node type, which may occur anywhere in the document, intended to carry instructions to the application.

Processing instructions are exposed in the Document Object Model as Node.PROCESSING_INSTRUCTION_NODE, and they can be used in XPath and XQuery with the 'processing-instruction()' command.

Syntax 
An SGML processing instruction is enclosed within <? and >.

An XML processing instruction is enclosed within <? and ?>, and contains a target and optionally some content, which is the node value, that cannot contain the sequence ?>.
<?PITarget PIContent?>

The XML Declaration at the beginning of an XML document (shown below) is another example of a processing instruction, however it may not technically be considered one.
<?xml version="1.0" encoding="UTF-8" ?>

Examples 
The most common use of a processing instruction is to request the XML document be rendered using a stylesheet using the 'xml-stylesheet' target, which was standardized in 1999.  It can be used for both XSLT and CSS stylesheets.
<?xml-stylesheet type="text/xsl" href="style.xsl"?>
<?xml-stylesheet type="text/css" href="style.css"?>

The DocBook XSLT stylesheets understand a number of processing instructions to override the default behaviour.

A draft specification for Robots exclusion standard rules inside XML documents uses processing instructions.

References

External links 
 XML specification section: Processing Instructions
 XSLT FAQ: Processing Instructions, Dave Pawson
 xslt:processing-instruction, Mozilla

XML